Karl Hess Larsen (1900–1966) was a Norwegian lawyer and politician.  He served as the County Governor of Nordland county from 1940 until 1951, although he was deposed by the Nasjonal Samling government from 1941 to 1945 during the German occupation of Norway. After the war, he was reinstated as governor.  In 1951, he was appointed to be the County Governor of Østfold county, a position he held until his death in 1966.

References

1900 births
1966 deaths
County governors of Nordland
County governors of Norway